Stenocercus rhodomelas, the red-black whorltail iguana, is a species of lizard of the Tropiduridae family. It is found in Ecuador.

References

Stenocercus
Reptiles described in 1899
Endemic fauna of Ecuador
Reptiles of Ecuador
Taxa named by George Albert Boulenger